Eyk Pokorny (born 22 November 1969) is a German cyclist. He competed in the men's sprint at the 1996 Summer Olympics.

Major results

1991
 1st  Tandem, UCI Amateur World Championships (with Emanuel Raasch)
1993
 2nd Sprint, National Track Championships
 3nd  Sprint, UCI World Championships
1994
 2nd Sprint, National Track Championships
1995
 2nd Sprint, National Track Championships
1996
 2nd Sprint, National Track Championships
1997
 1st  Omnium sprint, European Track Championships
 National Track Championships
1st  Sprint
1st  Team sprint (with Jan van Eijden and Sören Lausberg)
 2nd  Team sprint, UCI World Championships
1998
 National Track Championships
2nd Sprint
2nd Team sprint
 3rd  Team sprint, UCI World Championships
1999
 National Track Championships
1st  Team sprint (with Jan van Eijden and Jens Fiedler)
2nd Sprint
 3rd  Team sprint, UCI World Championships
2000
 3rd Sprint, National Track Championships
2001
 National Track Championships
1st  Team sprint (with Sören Lausberg and Jens Fiedler)
2nd Sprint
3rd Keirin

References

External links
 

1969 births
Living people
German male cyclists
Olympic cyclists of Germany
Cyclists at the 1996 Summer Olympics
Cyclists from Berlin